Suhaas Ahuja is an Indian actor who has worked in Hindi films and television serials. He debuted in the movie Knock Knock, I'm looking to marry and is widely known for his role in the Aamir Khan starrer Talaash.

Suhaas Ahuja was recently seen in the popular web series, 'The Married Woman', directed by Sahir Raza. The star cast also includes Ridhi Dogra, and Monica Dogra in lead roles.

Filmography

Films

Television
Kyunki Saas Bhi Kabhi Bahu Thi as Sharad (Sissy) Nanda
Bahu Hamari Rajni Kant as Mathew
P.O.W. - Bandi Yuddh Ke as Salim Khan

Web series
M.O.M. - Mission Over Mars (2019) as Rajat Sinha
The Married Woman (2021) as Hemant Kapoor
Out of Love (2019-2021) as Vidyut
Sikhsha mandal (2022)

Composer
"Tripping on a bicycle"
"Autumn"
"Shor" (Noise)
"Adhe Adhure"

Music
Autumn

References

 http://timesofindia.indiatimes.com/tv/india/suhaas-ahuja-to-tie-the-knot-on-february-14/articleshow/56048788.cms
 http://indiatoday.intoday.in/story/p-o-w-actor-suhaas-ahuja-to-get-married-on-valentines-day-lifetv/1/837959.html

1977 births
Living people
Male actors from Chennai
Indian male composers
Indian male singer-songwriters
Indian singer-songwriters
Singers from Chennai
Male actors in Hindi cinema
Male actors in Hindi television